The Element of Crime is a 1984 experimental neo-noir crime film co-written and directed by Lars von Trier. It is the first feature film directed by Trier and the first installment of the director's Europa trilogy – succeeded by Epidemic (1987) and Europa (1991).

Plot
A detective named Fisher, who has become an expatriate living in Cairo, undergoes hypnosis in order to recall his last case. The Europe of his dreamlike recollection is a dystopia, dark and decaying. Fisher remembers pursuing an elusive killer called the "Lotto Murderer", who was strangling and then mutilating young girls who were selling lottery tickets. He attempts to track down the killer using the controversial methods outlined in a book entitled The Element of Crime, written by his disgraced mentor, Osborne. He is joined in his search by a prostitute named Kim, who, it turns out, has had a child by his target. Fisher's search is based on a tailing report written by Osborne when trying to track down a murderer who had been killing in the same way as the "Lotto Murderer", but who, supposedly, has since died in a crash. The Osborne method requires the detective to try to identify with the mind of the killer. This he does, but, in so doing, begins to behave more and more like a serial killer himself.

Cast

Style
The film employs the film noir conventions of monochrome footage, apparently constant night, and the frequent presence of water, such as rain and rivers. The film is shot almost entirely in sodium light resulting in images reminiscent of sepia tone, though with a more intense yellow. Because sodium lamps produce light in only a few narrow emission peaks, rather than over a wide spectrum, the film has an almost monochrome appearance. The sepia is occasionally contrasted with piercing blues and reds.

The world depicted in the film is semi-derelict. Disordered collections of similar or identical objects are found in many of the scenes, reinforcing the sense of a crumbling society. Examples include white paper, light bulbs, heaps of keys, surgical scissors, glass bottles, rubber stamps, and Coca-Cola cans.

The film's slow pace, dark visuals and occasional surreal imagery give it a dreamlike quality. In addition, much of the dialogue is contradictory. An example is one conversation between Fisher and his mentor's housekeeper:
Fisher: Is it always as dark as this at this time of year?
Housekeeper: There are no seasons anymore. The last three summers haven't been summers. The weather changes all the time. It never alters.

In the opening of the film, a shot of a donkey lying on its back and then slowly struggling to stand may be a homage to a similar shot in Andrei Tarkovsky's Andrei Rublev (1966). Trier has stated that he is an admirer of Tarkovsky's work:

I was very inspired by Tarkovsky. I won't make any bones about that. I saw an excerpt from The Mirror (Zerkalo) on Swedish television once, just a travelling shot around that house, and that was one of those 'I'll be damned' experiences.

Reception

Critical response
The Element of Crime polarized critics at Cannes in 1984. Review aggregator Rotten Tomatoes reports that 77% of critics gave the film a positive review.

Accolades
The film received several awards including the Bodil Awards and Robert Awards in 1985 for the Best Film, and was nominated for the Palme d'Or at the 1984 Cannes Film Festival.

Home media
The Element of Crime has been released on DVD in North America by the Criterion Collection. In Europe, a digitally remastered DVD is available as part of the box set Lars von Trier's Europe Trilogy – Hypnotic Edition.

Legacy
Paul Barker sampled Osborne's manifesto from the movie in his remix song "Vagine Mine" (Deflowering Mix) which is a remix of a song by the band Puscifer.

References

External links
 
 
 
 The Element of Crime an essay by Peter Cowie at the Criterion Collection
 

1980s avant-garde and experimental films
1980s serial killer films
1984 directorial debut films
1984 drama films
1984 films
1980s Arabic-language films
Best Danish Film Bodil Award winners
Best Danish Film Robert Award winners
Danish drama films
1980s English-language films
Films about prostitution
Films directed by Lars von Trier
Films about hypnosis
Films set in Egypt
Films set in Germany
Films shot in Denmark
Neo-noir
Prostitution in Denmark
1984 multilingual films
Danish multilingual films